Justin Eichorn (born May 7, 1984) is an American politician and member of the Minnesota Senate. A member of the Republican Party of Minnesota, he represents District 5 in north-central Minnesota.

Early life, education, and career
Eichorn attended Itasca Community College and Concordia University. He served on the Grand Rapids Housing and Redevelopment Authority.

Minnesota Senate
Eichorn was elected to the Minnesota Senate in 2016. He ran for the Minnesota House of Representatives in District 5B in 2014, losing to incumbent Tom Anzelc.

Personal life
Eichorn and his wife, Brittany, have four children and reside in Grand Rapids.

References

External links

 Official Senate website
 Official campaign website

1984 births
Living people
People from Grand Rapids, Minnesota
Concordia University (Saint Paul, Minnesota) alumni
Republican Party Minnesota state senators
21st-century American politicians